Harry Pree Billiard (November 11, 1883 – June 3, 1923), nicknamed "Pree", was an American Major League Baseball pitcher who played in  with the New York Highlanders of the American League, then in  with the Indianapolis Hoosiers, continuing with the team in  when it moved and became the Newark Pepper. He batted and threw left-handed.

External links

1883 births
1923 deaths
Major League Baseball pitchers
Baseball players from Indiana
New York Highlanders players
Indianapolis Hoosiers players
Newark Peppers players
Meridian Ribboners players
Lynchburg Shoemakers players
Macon Peaches players
Augusta Tourists players
San Antonio Bronchos players
Terre Haute Miners players
Indianapolis Hoosiers (minor league) players
Hartford Senators players
Providence Grays (minor league) players